The First Class 8 (FC8) is a One-Design keelboat designed in 1982 by Group Finot and Jacques Fouroux to be constructed at Beneteau's shipyard.

It is one of Europe's most competitive sailing classes, with more than 1,000 units sold between 1982 and 1994.

Strongest fleets are located in France, Belgium, Spain, Italy, Germany, Norway and Portugal.

It is a long boat compared with its competitors such as the J/24 from America. It has straight lines for a boat of that age and has no reference to IOR hull shapes with huge beam, flared bows, and pinched sterns. The boat's lines lend themselves to a dinghy style planing hull, as opposed to digging a hole in the ocean which was a characteristic of the mid period IOR boats. The FC8 has a lot of wetted surface area which makes it slow in light air.

References

External links
 Club First 8  - Italian Association
 First Class 8 On Finot website (En)

Keelboats
1980s sailboat type designs
Sailboat types built by Beneteau
Sailboat type designs by Jacques Fauroux
Sailboat type designs by Groupe Finot